Laurel Springs Ranch is a  ranch located on a ridgetop in the Santa Ynez Mountain range northwest of Santa Barbara, California, between the Painted Cave community and the intersection of Painted Cave road with East Camino Cielo Road in the Los Padres National Forest.

History

Homer Snyder developed the ranch in 1902, and built the Laurel Springs Inn on the property in 1905. George Owen Knapp bought it in 1916. 

In 1977, actress Jane Fonda and her husband Tom Hayden bought it and she later operated both a workout studio spa and a summer camp for disadvantaged children there until the early 1990s. 

It was then bought by Melissa Keeler and Michael Morris.  Together they developed it into the Laurel Springs Retreat, and is now used for group trainings and individual rentals.

See also
Knapp's Castle
Santa Ynez Mountains

References
"Looking Forward by Looking Back," The Santa Barbara Independent, April 27, 2006
"San Marcos Pass History," Scott Williams
"George Owen Knapp," Ray Ford
"A Life in the Spotlight," The Santa Barbara Independent, May 11, 2006
Jane Fonda's Workout Studio
Bob Feldman, Downtown, February 2, 1994
"Defining Tom Hayden," Los Angeles Times, December 10, 2000

External links
Laurel Springs Retreat: History
Overhead Aerial Photo

Ranches in California
Geography of Santa Barbara County, California
Buildings and structures in Santa Barbara County, California